"Sólo Parecía Amor" (English: It Only Seemed Like Love) is a song by Mexican singer-songwriter Thalía from her twelfth studio album Amore Mío (2014). The song was written by José Luis Ortega and Armando Avila and produced by Armando Avila. It was released by Sony Music Latin as the third single from the album in the Mexican territory and fourth overall on April 14, 2015.

Release and reception
On February 20, 2015 Thalía announced on her social media that she was on her way to film the music video for the song. The song was released as an official single on April 14, 2015. The song debuted in Mexico's general airplay chart, gaining moderate success. In the pop chart, published by Monitor Latino, the song peaked at #1.

Music video
The official video for the song was released on Thalía's official YouTube channel on April 28, 2015. The video shows Thalía in different rooms reflecting on a failed relationship.

Charts

Awards and nominations
The song was nominated for Best Pop Video at the 2015 Quiero Awards.

References 

 

Thalía songs
2015 singles
Sony Music Latin singles
Spanish-language songs
2015 songs
Pop ballads